The City of Waterloo Carousel is located in Waterloo, Wisconsin.

History
The carousel was built by the C.W. Parker Amusement Company. It was owned by the Curtis Brother Carnival based out of Cuba City, Wisconsin until 1925 when it was purchased by the City of Waterloo. After arriving in Waterloo, the carousel was placed in Fireman's Park. It remains in the park, though it has been moved to a different location within it after it was damaged from flooding. The carousel was added to the State and the National Register of Historic Places in 1997.

References

Carousels on the National Register of Historic Places
Buildings and structures on the National Register of Historic Places in Wisconsin
National Register of Historic Places in Jefferson County, Wisconsin
Tourist attractions in Jefferson County, Wisconsin
Amusement rides introduced in 1911